Xylosalsola is a genus of flowering plants belonging to the family Amaranthaceae. Its native range is Southern European Russia to Mongolia and Pakistan. Its species include:
 Xylosalsola arbuscula (Pall.) Tzvelev 
 Xylosalsola chiwensis (Popov) Akhani & Roalson 
 Xylosalsola paletzkiana (Litv.) Akhani & Roalson 
 Xylosalsola richteri (Moq.) Akhani & Roalson

References

Amaranthaceae
Amaranthaceae genera